South Newfane is an unincorporated village in the town of Newfane, Windham County, Vermont, United States.

References

Unincorporated communities in Windham County, Vermont
Unincorporated communities in Vermont